Roberto Queralt (2 January 1931 – 26 January 1997) was a Spanish swimmer. He competed in the men's 100 metre freestyle and the water polo tournament at the 1952 Summer Olympics.

References

External links
 

1931 births
1997 deaths
Spanish male water polo players
Olympic swimmers of Spain
Olympic water polo players of Spain
Swimmers at the 1952 Summer Olympics
Water polo players at the 1952 Summer Olympics
Swimmers from Barcelona
Spanish male freestyle swimmers
20th-century Spanish people